The Grand Duchy of Luxembourg is divided into cantons, which group the communes (=municipalities). A dozen of the communes have official city status, and one, Luxembourg City, is further divided into quarters (unofficial subdivision).

Districts

Luxembourg was divided into three districts until October 2015:
Diekirch
Grevenmacher
Luxembourg

Cantons

There are a total of 12 cantons, which were previously a subdivision of the districts but are now the first-level subdivision of Luxembourg.

Communes

The communes (municipalities) are the lowest administrative division in Luxembourg.

Cities

12 communes have legal city status, some since the early Middle Ages. The City of Luxembourg, the nation's capital, is the largest city in the country.

Quarters of Luxembourg City

Below the official administrative level of the commune, Luxembourg City has further unofficial administrative subdivisions, known as quarters.  The twenty-four quarters of Luxembourg City are a de facto subdivision without legal basis used to simplify public administration.

See also
 Legislative circonscriptions